Emre Yücel (born June 25, 1983 in Kocaeli, Turkey) is a Turkish football player who currently plays as a goalkeeper for Kocaelispor.

References

1983 births
MKE Ankaragücü footballers
Living people
Turkish footballers
Kocaelispor footballers
Erzurumspor footballers
Turkey youth international footballers
Sportspeople from İzmit

Association football goalkeepers